Waterville Township is one of the eleven townships of Lucas County, Ohio, United States. The 2010 census found 11,336 people in the township, up from 9,469 people in 2000.

Geography
Located in the southern part of the county along the Maumee River, it borders the following townships:
Monclova Township - north
Perrysburg Township, Wood County - northeast
Middleton Township, Wood County - east
Washington Township, Wood County - south
Providence Township - southwest
Swanton Township - northwest

Two villages are located in Waterville Township: Waterville in the southeast along the Maumee River, and Whitehouse in the northwest.

Name and history
It is the only Waterville Township statewide.

Education
Students from Waterville Township attend the Anthony Wayne Local School District.

Government
The township is governed by a three-member board of trustees, who are elected in November of odd-numbered years to a four-year term beginning on the following January 1. Two are elected in the year after the presidential election and one is elected in the year before it. There is also an elected township fiscal officer, who serves a four-year term beginning on April 1 of the year after the election, which is held in November of the year before the presidential election. Vacancies in the fiscal officership or on the board of trustees are filled by the remaining trustees.

References

External links
Township website
County website
Anthony Wayne Schools

Townships in Lucas County, Ohio
Townships in Ohio